James Robert Perch (born 28 September 1985) is an English professional footballer who plays for Mansfield Town. Perch is versatile and has covered many positions in both defence and across midfield. However, he is usually deployed at right back.

Career

Nottingham Forest
Perch was born in Mansfield, Nottinghamshire and began his career at Nottingham Forest. He made 22 league appearances in his début season as Forest were relegated from the rebranded Football League Championship. His first professional goal came in the same season, scoring in the 63rd minute against Doncaster Rovers in the Third Round of the Football League Cup. After his first season, he signed a new contract to extend his stay a further 2 1/2 years. He made over 200 appearances for Forest (including 30 league appearances in the 2007/08 campaign when Forest were promoted back to the Championship) before moving to newly promoted Newcastle United.

Newcastle United
On 5 July 2010, Perch signed for Newcastle United for an undisclosed fee believed to be around £1 million, on a four-year deal. Forest had rejected a transfer bid from Newcastle in January of the same year. He made his debut for Newcastle against Manchester United on 16 August 2010 in a 3–0 defeat. On 18 September 2010, he set a new Premier League record by being the first player ever to receive five yellow cards in his first five games in the league.
His only goal for Newcastle came in a 4–3 defeat to Manchester United at Old Trafford in the Premier League.
During his stay, Perch was nicknamed "Perchinho" due to the fans respect for his steady performances, including both championship and Premiership games such as v Liverpool (April 2012)

Wigan Athletic
On 3 July 2013, Perch completed a move to recently relegated FA Cup holders Wigan Athletic, signing a four-year contract with the club. The transfer fee was undisclosed, but was estimated to be around £750,000. Perch made his league debut for Wigan on 3 August 2013, in a 4–0 away victory over Barnsley. He scored his first goal for the club on 9 March 2014, in a 2–1 win against Premier League Manchester City, helping holders Wigan to the semi-finals of the FA Cup for the second year in a row.

Queens Park Rangers
On 31 July 2015, Perch signed for Championship side Queens Park Rangers on a three-year deal for an undisclosed fee. Perch made his competitive QPR debut in the first game of the 2015-16 Championship Season which resulted in a 2–0 defeat against Charlton Athletic, he played the whole game.

On 6 April 2018, it was announced that Perch would leave the club at the end of the 2017–18 season.

Scunthorpe United
He joined Scunthorpe United in August 2018, signing a two-year contract.

Mansfield Town
Perch signed for his hometown club Mansfield Town in August 2020. He suffered a fractured skull in August 2021 that initially ruled him out of action for the 2021–22 season. Perch made a return to training quicker than expected in January 2022, and made his return to the starting line-up against Port Vale on 15 March.

International career
In October 2012, he was approached by the Jamaica Football Federation, who wanted Perch to play for Jamaica during their 2014 FIFA World Cup qualifying campaign. Perch is also eligible for Barbados through his father, who was born on the island.

Career statistics

Honours
Nottingham Forest
Football League One runner-up: 2007–08

References

External links

 
 

1985 births
Living people
Footballers from Mansfield
Black British sportspeople
English footballers
English people of Jamaican descent
English people of Barbadian descent
Association football defenders
Association football midfielders
Association football utility players
Nottingham Forest F.C. players
Newcastle United F.C. players
Wigan Athletic F.C. players
Premier League players
English Football League players
Queens Park Rangers F.C. players
Scunthorpe United F.C. players
Mansfield Town F.C. players